Detroit City High School was a secondary school located in Detroit, Michigan, United States. It was one of the many public high schools in the Detroit Public School District. It closed in 2012 and demolished in 2016.

Sources 

Trulia info
USNews and World Report

High schools in Detroit
2012 disestablishments in Michigan
Former high schools in Michigan
Detroit Public Schools Community District
Educational institutions disestablished in 2012